Augsburg is a city in Swabia, Bavaria, Germany, around  west of Bavarian capital Munich. It is a university town and regional seat of the Regierungsbezirk Schwaben with an impressive Altstadt (historical city centre). Augsburg is an urban district and home to the institutions of the Landkreis Augsburg. It is the third-largest city in Bavaria (after Munich and Nuremberg) with a population of 300,000 inhabitants, with 885,000 in its metropolitan area.

After Neuss, Trier, Cologne and Xanten, Augsburg is one of Germany's oldest cities, founded in 15 BC by the Romans as Augusta Vindelicorum, named after the Roman emperor Augustus. It was a Free Imperial City from 1276 to 1803 and the home of the patrician Fugger and Welser families that dominated European banking in the 16th century. According to Behringer, in the sixteenth century, it became "the dominant centre of early capitalism", having benefitted from being part of the Kaiserliche Reichspost system as "the location of the most important post office within the Holy Roman Empire" and the city's close connection to Maximilian I. The city played a leading role in the Reformation as the site of the 1530 Augsburg Confession and 1555 Peace of Augsburg. The Fuggerei, the oldest social housing complex in the world, was founded in 1513 by Jakob Fugger.

In 2019, UNESCO recognized the Water Management System of Augsburg as a World Heritage Site because of its unique medieval canals and water towers and its testimony to the development of hydraulic engineering.

Geography
Augsburg lies at the convergence of the Alpine rivers Lech and Wertach and on the Singold. The oldest part of the city and the southern quarters are on the northern foothills of a high terrace, which has emerged between the steep rim of the hills of Friedberg in the east and the high hills of the west. In the south extends the Lechfeld, an outwash plain of the post ice age between the rivers Lech and Wertach, where rare primeval landscapes were preserved. The Augsburg city forest and the Lech valley heaths today rank among the most species-rich middle European habitats.

Augsburg borders on the nature park Augsburg Western Woods - a large forestland. The city itself is also heavily verdant. As a result, in 1997 Augsburg was the first German city to win the Europe-wide contest Entente Florale for Europe's greenest and most livable city.

Suburbs and neighbouring municipalities
Augsburg is surrounded by the counties Landkreis Augsburg in the west and Aichach-Friedberg in the east.

The suburbs of Augsburg are Friedberg, Königsbrunn, Stadtbergen, Neusäß, Gersthofen, Diedorf.

Neighbouring municipalities: Rehling, Affing, Kissing, Mering, Merching, Bobingen, Gessertshausen.

History

Early history

The city of Augsburg was founded in 15 BC on the orders of Emperor Augustus. Emperor Augustus conducted extensive military campaigns and established administrative settlements. The settlement that became Augsburg was known as Augusta Vindelicorum, meaning "the Augustan city of the Vindelici". The settlement was established at the convergence of the Alpine rivers Lech and Wertach. In 120 AD Augsburg became the administrative capital of the Roman province Raetia. Augsburg was sacked by the Huns in the fifth century AD, by Charlemagne in the eighth century, and by Welf I, Duke of Bavaria in the 11th century.

Augsburg Confession

Augsburg was granted the status of a Free Imperial City on 9 March 1276 and from then until 1803, it was independent of its former overlord, the Prince-Bishop of Augsburg. Frictions between the city-state and the prince-bishops were to remain frequent however, particularly after Augsburg became Protestant and curtailed the rights and freedoms of Catholics. With its strategic location at an intersection of trade routes to Italy, the Free Imperial City of Augsburg became a major trading center.

Augsburg produced large quantities of woven goods, cloth and textiles. Augsburg became the base of two banking families that rose to great prominence, the Fuggers and the Welsers. The Fugger family donated the Fuggerei part of the city devoted to housing for needy citizens in 1516, which remains in use today.

In 1530, the Augsburg Confession was presented to the Holy Roman Emperor at the Diet of Augsburg. Following the Peace of Augsburg in 1555, after which the rights of religious minorities in imperial cities were to be legally protected, a mixed Catholic–Protestant city council presided over a majority Protestant population; see Paritätische Reichsstadt.

Leading European centre of capitalism of the sixteenth century

Augsburg's economic boom years occurred during the 15th and 16th centuries thanks to the bank and metal businesses of the merchant families Fugger, Welser and Hochstetter. These families held a near total monopoly in important industries. Monopolies were considered criminal in contemporary laws and these families' practices were criticized by Martin Luther himself, but as Emperor Charles V needed their financial assistance, he cancelled the charged in the 1530s. In the 16th century Augsburg became one of Germany's largest cities. Augsburg was a major manufacturing center for textiles, armor, scientific instruments, as well as gold- and silver-smithing. The prolific printers of Augsburg also made the city the largest producer of German-language books in the Holy Roman Empire. Like other free imperial cities, Augsburg was an independent entity, and had authority over its tax policies.

Augsburg's wealth attracted artists seeking patrons. The city rapidly became a creative centre for sculptors and musicians. Augsburg became the base of the Holbein family, starting with Hans Holbein the Elder. The composer Leopold Mozart was born and educated in Augsburg. Rococo became so prevalent that it became known as "Augsburg style" throughout Germany.

Augsburg benefitted majorly from the establishment and expansion of the Kaiserliche Reichspost in the late 15th and early 16th century. From Maximilian's time, as the "terminuses of the first transcontinental post lines" began to shift from Innsbruck to Venice and from Brussels to Antwerpt, in these cities, the communication system and the news market started to converge. As the Fuggers as well as other trading companies based their most important branches in these cities, these traders gained access to these systems as well.(Despite a widely circulated theory which holds that the Fuggers themselves operated their own communication system, in reality they relied upon the imperial posts, presumably from the 1490s onwards, as official members of the court of Maximilian I).

Witch hunts
Several witch hunts occurred in Augsburg in the late 16th century. Following the 1585–1588 plague epidemic, southeast Germany was shattered by the 1589–1591 witch hunts. Following the 1592–1593 plague epidemic, cities in southeast Germany entered a period of inflation, marked by brutal witch hunts in urban areas.

Thirty Years' War
Religious peace in the city was largely maintained despite increasing tensions up to the Thirty Years' War (1618–1648). In 1629, the Holy Roman Emperor Ferdinand II issued the Edict of Restitution, which restored the legal situation of 1552. However, the edict was revoked in April 1632, when Gustavus Adolphus of Sweden occupied Augsburg.

In 1634, the Swedish army was defeated at the nearby Battle of Nördlingen. By October 1634, Catholic troops had surrounded Augsburg. The Swedish army refused to surrender and a siege ensued through the winter of 1634/35 and thousands died from hunger and disease. During the Swedish occupation and the siege by Catholic troops, the population of the city was reduced from about 70,000 to about 16,000. Diseases such as typhus and the plague ravaged the city.

Guilds
In the first half of the 17th century Augsburg was pivotal in the European network of goldsmiths. Augsburg attracted goldsmith journeymen from all over Europe and in the 18th century a large number of silversmiths and goldsmiths became master craftsman in Augsburg.

Nine Years' War
In 1686 the Holy Roman Emperor Leopold I formed the League of Augsburg, also known as the "Grand Alliance" after England joined in 1689. The coalition consisted at various times of Austria, Bavaria, Brandenburg, England, the Holy Roman Empire, the Electorate of the Palatinate, Portugal, Savoy, Saxony, Spain, Sweden, and the Dutch Republic. The coalition was formed to defend the Electorate of the Palatinate and fought against France in the Nine Years' War.

End of Free Imperial City status

The Reichsdeputationshauptschluss or the Final Recess of 1803, saw the annexation of nearly all of the 51 Free Imperial Cities, excepting Augsburg and five others. However, when the Holy Roman Empire was dissolved in 1806, Napoleon encouraged his German allies to mediatize their smaller neighbours, and Augsburg lost its independence. It was annexed to the Kingdom of Bavaria. In 1817, the city became an administrative capital of the Oberdonaukreis, then administrative capital in 1837 for the district Swabia and Neuburg.

Industrial revolution
During the end of the 19th century, Augsburg's textile industry again rose to prominence followed by the machine manufacturing industry.

Second World War and Cold War
Augsburg was historically a militarily important city due to its strategic location.
During the German re-armament before the Second World War, the Wehrmacht enlarged Augsburg's one original Kaserne (barracks) to three: Somme Kaserne (housing Wehrmacht Artillerie-Regiment 27); Arras Kaserne (housing Wehrmacht Infanterie Regiment 27) and Panzerjäger Kaserne (housing Panzerabwehr-Abteilung 27 (later Panzerjäger-Abteilung 27)). Wehrmacht Panzerjäger-Abteilung 27 was later moved to Füssen.

The MAN factory at Augsburg was the largest German manufacturer of engines for U-boats in World War II and became the target of the Augsburg Raid. When the Avro Lancaster bomber was new in service, the RAF sent 12 at low level to bomb the factory in daylight, on 17 April 1942. The bombers were intercepted en-route and only five returned, all damaged. The factory was damaged but production continued; the factory was repeatedly bombed later. A subcamp of the Dachau concentration camp outside Augsburg supplied approximately 1,300 forced labourers to local military-related industry, especially the Messerschmitt AG military aircraft firm, headquartered in Augsburg.

In 1941, Rudolf Hess, without Adolf Hitler's permission, secretly took off from a local Augsburg airport and flew to Scotland, crashing in Eaglesham. His objective was to meet the Duke of Hamilton in an attempt to mediate the end of the European front of World War II and join sides for the upcoming Russian Campaign.

The Reichswehr Infanterie Regiment 19 was stationed in Augsburg and became the base unit for the Wehrmacht Infanterie Regiment 40, a subsection of the Wehrmacht Infanterie Division 27 (which later became the Wehrmacht Panzerdivision 17). Elements of Wehrmacht II Battalion of Gebirgs-Jäger-Regiment 99 (especially Wehrmacht Panzerjäger Kompanie 14) was composed of parts of the Wehrmacht Infanterie Division 27. The Infanterie Regiment 40 remained in Augsburg until the end of the war, finally surrendering to the United States when on 28 April 1945, the U.S. Army occupied the city. The city and its Messerschmitt works were bombed on three occasions during the war. Collateral damage included the destruction of just under 25% of all homes in the city and the deaths of several hundred people.

Following the war, the three Kaserne would change hands confusingly between the American and Germans, finally ending up in US hands for the duration of the Cold War. They became the three main US barracks in Augsburg: Reese, Sheridan and FLAK. US Base FLAK had been an anti-aircraft barracks since 1936 and US Base Sheridan "united" the former infantry barracks with a smaller Kaserne for former Luftwaffe communications units.

The American military presence in the city started with the U.S. 5th Infantry Division stationed at FLAK Kaserne from 1945 to 1955, then by 11th Airborne Division, followed by the 24th Infantry Division, U.S. Army VII Corps artillery, USASA Field Station Augsburg and finally the 66th Military Intelligence Brigade, which returned the former Kaserne to German hands in 1998. Originally the Heeresverpflegungshauptamt Südbayern and an Officers' caisson existed on or near the location of Reese-Kaserne, but was demolished by the occupying Americans.

Politics

Municipality

From 1266 until 1548, the terms Stadtpfleger (head of town council) and Mayor were used interchangeably, or occasionally, simultaneously. In 1548 the title was finally fixed to Stadtpfleger, who officiated for several years and was then awarded the title for life (though no longer governing), thus resulting confusingly, in records of two or more simultaneous Stadtpfleger.

After the transfer to Bavaria in 1806, Augsburg was ruled by a Magistrate with two mayors, supported by an additional council of "Community Commissioners": the Gemeindebevollmächtige.

As of 1907, the Mayor was entitled Oberbürgermeister, as Augsburg had reached a population of 100,000, as per the Bavarian Gemeindeordnung.

Mayor
The current mayor of Augsburg is Eva Weber of the Christian Social Union (CSU) since 2020. The most recent mayoral election was held on 15 March 2020, with a runoff held on 29 March, and the results were as follows:

! rowspan=2 colspan=2| Candidate
! rowspan=2| Party
! colspan=2| First round
! colspan=2| Second round
|-
! Votes
! %
! Votes
! %
|-
| bgcolor=| 
| align=left| Eva Weber
| align=left| Christian Social Union
| 41,534
| 43.1
| 63,762
| 62.3
|-
| bgcolor=| 
| align=left| Dirk Wurm
| align=left| Social Democratic Party
| 18,116
| 18.8
| 38,532
| 37.7
|-
| bgcolor=| 
| align=left| Martina Wild
| align=left| Alliance 90/The Greens
| 17,851
| 18.5
|-
| bgcolor=| 
| align=left| Andreas Jurca
| align=left| Alternative for Germany
| 4,673
| 4.8
|-
| bgcolor=| 
| align=left| Peter Hummel
| align=left| Free Voters of Bavaria
| 3,053
| 3.2
|-
| bgcolor=| 
| align=left| Frederik Hintermayr
| align=left| The Left
| 2,564
| 2.7
|-
| bgcolor=| 
| align=left| Lisa McQueen
| align=left| Die PARTEI
| 1,896
| 2.0
|-
| 
| align=left| Bruno Marcon
| align=left| Augsburg in the Citizens' Hands
| 1,478
| 1.5
|-
| 
| align=left| Anna Tabak
| align=left| We are Augsburg
| 1,261
| 1.3
|-
| bgcolor=| 
| align=left| Lars Vollmar
| align=left| Free Democratic Party
| 1,249
| 1.3
|-
| bgcolor=| 
| align=left| Christian Pettinger
| align=left| Ecological Democratic Party
| 1,183
| 1.2
|-
| 
| align=left| Claudia Eberle
| align=left| Pro Augsburg
| 941
| 1.0
|-
| bgcolor=| 
| align=left| Florian Betz
| align=left| V-Partei³
| 678
| 0.7
|-
! colspan=3| Valid votes
! 96,477
! 99.4
! 102,294
! 99.4
|-
! colspan=3| Invalid votes
! 578
! 0.6
! 661
! 0.6
|-
! colspan=3| Total
! 97,055
! 100.0
! 102,955
! 100.0
|-
! colspan=3| Electorate/voter turnout
! 214,110
! 45.3
! 213,982
! 48.1
|-
| colspan=7| Source: City of Augsburg (first round, second round)
|}

City council

The Augsburg city council governs the city alongside the Mayor. The most recent city council election was held on 15 March 2020, and the results were as follows:

! colspan=2| Party
! Votes
! %
! +/-
! Seats
! +/-
|-
| bgcolor=| 
| align=left| Christian Social Union (CSU)
| 1,653,781
| 32.3
|  5.4
| 20
|  3
|-
| bgcolor=| 
| align=left| Alliance 90/The Greens (Grüne)
| 1,198,090
| 23.4
|  11.0
| 14
|  7
|-
| bgcolor=| 
| align=left| Social Democratic Party (SPD)
| 734,066
| 14.3
|  8.1
| 9
|  4
|-
| bgcolor=| 
| align=left| Alternative for Germany (AfD)
| 337,834
| 6.6
|  0.7
| 4
| ±0
|-
| bgcolor=#007E82| 
| align=left| Free Voters of Bavaria (FW)
| 230,952
| 4.5
|  0.9
| 3
|  1
|-
| bgcolor=| 
| align=left| The Left (Die Linke)
| 189,034
| 3.7
|  0.5
| 2
| ±0
|-
| bgcolor=| 
| align=left| Free Democratic Party (FDP)
| 117,201
| 2.3
|  0.7
| 1
| ±0
|-
| bgcolor=| 
| align=left| Ecological Democratic Party (ÖDP)
| 114,119
| 2.2
|  0.3
| 1
| ±0
|-
| 
| align=left| Generation AUX (GenAUX)
| 108,956
| 2.1
| New
| 1
| New
|-
| 
| align=left| Augsburg in the Citizens' Hands (AiB)
| 96,690
| 1.9
| New
| 1
| New
|-
| 
| align=left| Pro Augsburg (PRO A)
| 94,346
| 1.8
|  3.3
| 1
|  2
|-
| 
| align=left| We are Augsburg (WSA)
| 77,189
| 1.5
| New
| 1
| New
|-
| bgcolor=| 
| align=left| Die PARTEI
| 76,557
| 1.5
| New
| 1
| New
|-
| bgcolor=| 
| align=left| V-Partei³
| 69,643
| 1.4
| New
| 1
| New
|-
| colspan=7 bgcolor=lightgrey| 
|-
| 
| align=left| Political Voters' Association/Democracy in Motion (Polit-WG/DiB)
| 29,149
| 0.6
|  2.5
| 0
|  1
|-
! colspan=2| Total
! 5,127,607
! 100.0
! 
! 
! 
|-
! colspan=2| Invalid votes
! 2,079
! 2.1
! 
! 
! 
|-
! colspan=2| Total
! 97,013
! 100.0
! 
! 60
! ±0
|-
! colspan=2| Electorate/voter turnout
! 214,110
! 45.3
!  4.1
! 
! 
|-
| colspan=7| Source: City of Augsburg
|}

Members of the Bundestag
Augsburg is located in the Wahlkreis 253 Augsburg-Stadt constituency, which includes Königsbrunn and parts of the District of Augsburg (Landkreis Augsburg).

Volker Ullrich of the CSU was directly elected to the Bundestag in the 18th German Bundestag.

Indirectly elected to the Bundestag to adhere to the Landesliste were Ulrike Bahr for the SPD and Claudia Roth for Bündnis 90/Die Grünen.

Climate
Augsburg has an oceanic climate (Köppen climate classification: Cfb) or, following the 0 °C isotherm, a humid continental climate (Dfb).

Main sights

Town Hall, built in 1620 in the Renaissance style with the Goldener Saal
Perlachturm, a bell tower built in 989
Fuggerei, the oldest social housing estate in the world, inhabited since 1523
Fuggerhäuser (Fugger houses), restored renaissance palatial homes of the Fugger banking family
Bishop's Residence, built about 1750 in order to replace the older bishop's palace; today the administrative seat of Swabia
Cathedral, founded in the ninth century
St. Anne's Church, medieval church building that was originally part of a monastery built in 1321
St. Mary's Syriac Orthodox Church on the Zusamstraße in Lechhausen, built 1998 by Suryoye (Assyrians)
Augsburg Synagogue, one of the few German synagogues to survive the war, now restored and open with a Jewish museum inside
Augsburg textile and industry museum-or just tim, organises it displays under headings Mensch-Maschine-Muster-Mode.
Schaezlerpalais, a Rococo mansion (1765) now housing a major art museum
St. Ulrich and St. Afra—one church is Roman Catholic, the other Lutheran, the duality being a result of the Peace of Augsburg concluded in 1555 between Catholics and Protestants
Mozart Haus Augsburg (where composer's father Leopold Mozart was born and Mozart visited it several times)
Augsburger Puppenkiste, a puppet theatre
Luther Stiege, museum located in a church, that shows Martin Luthers life and different rooms. (free admission)
Eiskanal, the world's first artificial whitewater course (venue for the whitewater events of the 1972 Munich Olympics)
Dorint Hotel Tower
Childhood home of Bertolt Brecht
The Augsburg Botanical Gardens (Botanischer Garten Augsburg)
Maximillian Museum
Bahnpark Augsburg home of 29 historic locomotives, blacksmith, historic roundhouse
3 magnificent renaissance fountains, the Augustus Fountain, Mercury Fountain and Hercules Fountain from the 15th century, build for the 1500th anniversary of city foundation
Walter Art Museum at the Glas Palast ("Glas-Palace")

Roman Museum located in the former Monastery of St. Magdalena. In December 2012, the church was closed due to risk of collapsing. In 2015, an exhibition opened in the Zeughaus, which will replace the museum for an indefinite period. Renovation work is ongoing and the Church will remain closed until further notice.

Medieval canals, used to run numerous industries, medieval arms production, silver art, sanitation and water pumping 
Kulturhaus Abraxas

Water Management System
The water systems of Augsburg have been the site of innovations in hydraulic engineering for centuries. Augsburg was built on top of an aquifer fed by the Lech and Wertach rivers, which provided purified groundwater that ran through the city through springs and streams. The canals channeling this water through the city were first mentioned in 1276, and by 1416, waterworks, pumps, and water towers were added to effectively distribute this water. In 1545, Augsburg was one of the first European towns to separate drinking water from water used for industry, effectively preventing water-borne diseases. The pumps and waterwheels also generated power for fountains and food processing, such as a 17th-century butcher's hall that still stands today. In the 19th and 20th centuries, hydroelectic power plants were also installed. These power plants were some of the first in the world to generate electricity from water, and they are still in use today.

On 6 July 2019, the Water Management System of Augsburg was designated as a UNESCO World Heritage Site.

Urban legends

Goddess Cisa and the Stadtpir
The pagan goddess Cisa has been linked to the civic emblem of Augsburg, known as Stadtpir. Cisa and the Stadtpir came to represent the prosperity of the city. The Stadtpir was stamped on cloth that was approved by the town cloth inspector. Metalworks produced in the city were also stamped with the Stadtpir. The Stadtpir adorns the 17th century town hall.

The Stoinerne Ma
The "Stoinerne Ma" ("Stony Man") is a life-size stone figure on the eastern Augsburg city wall in the area of the so-called "Sweden staircase", which is located in the immediate vicinity of the Galluskirche and St. Stephan convent (on the outside of the city wall). It is probably a one-armed baker with a loaf of bread and a shield. In the area of the feet there is a helically twisted pedestal.

According to the legend, it is the baker "Konrad Hackher" who, during a long siege of the city, baked bread from sawdust and threw it into the ditch clearly visible for the besiegers over the city wall. The impression that Augsburg would still have so much bread that one could throw it over the wall is said to have demoralized the besiegers so much that they fired at him with a crossbow out of anger. A hit struck off his arm, and soon afterwards the siege was broken off. Historically, the event belongs to the Thirty Years' War, more precisely to the siege of Augsburg during the years 1634/35, when Catholic Bavarian troops under Field Marshal von Wahl wanted to recapture the city occupied by the Protestant Swedes. The baker's deed is not reliably proven.

The statue is often visited by walkers strolling along the city wall. As it is said to be a fortunate thing to touch the stone figure's iron nose. This custom is particularly popular with lovers.

Bei den sieben Kindeln
In the wall of the property Bei den Sieben Kindeln 3 ("At the seven infants 3") there is a recessed stone relief from the Roman period. Legend says that the commemorative plaque was commissioned by a Roman officer to commemorate the drowning of one of his children (therefore it is said to be "seven" children, although the plaque represents only six: the seventh child is drowned and lies in the coffin). According to current knowledge, the plate once formed the long side of a Sarcophagus.

Lazarethe plague houses
The city of Augsburg had two civic plague houses. The two civic plague houses, called Lazarethe, were established when the black death first appeared in Augsburg in 1349. Thereafter they were opened whenever a plague epidemic occurred in the city. As soon as a medical practitioner, such as a barber surgeon, diagnosed the plague the patients were transferred to the plague houses by order of the city council. The transfer to the plague houses was publicly announced, so as to prevent panic and the breakdown of economic life. In the second half of the 18th century, the plague houses were used to treat other diseases, such as smallpox and scurvy.

Incorporations

Population

Augsburg has a population of about 300,000. It is the 3rd largest city in Bavaria and the largest city in Swabia region. Augsburg was in about 1500 with population of about 30,000 one of the largest city in Holy Roman Empire alongside with Cologne and Prague. Augsburg passed 100,000 in 1909 and the population grow normally since then.

Twin towns – sister cities

Augsburg is twinned with:

 Amagasaki, Japan (1959)
 Bourges, France (1963)
 Dayton, United States (1964)
 Inverness, Scotland, UK (1956)
 Jinan, China (2004)
 Liberec, Czech Republic (2001)
 Nagahama, Japan (1959)

Transport

Roads
The main road link is autobahn A 8 between Munich and Stuttgart.

Public transport
Public transport is very well catered for. It is controlled by the Augsburger Verkehrs- und Tarifverbund (Augsburg transport and tariff association, AVV) extended over central Swabia. There are seven rail Regionalbahn lines, five tram lines, 27 city bus lines and six night bus lines, as well as several taxi companies.

The Augsburg tramway network is now 35.5 km-long after the opening of new lines to the university in 1996, the northern city boundary in 2001 and to the Klinikum Augsburg (Augsburg hospital) in 2002. Tram line 6, which runs 5.2 km from Friedberg West to Hauptbahnhof (Central Station), opened in December 2010.

Intercity bus
There is one station for intercity bus services in Augsburg: Augsburg Nord, located in the north of the city.

Railway

Augsburg has seven stations, the Central Station (Hauptbahnhof), Hochzoll, Oberhausen, Haunstetterstraße, Morellstraße, Messe and Inningen. The Central Station, built from 1843 to 1846, is Germany's oldest main station in a large city still providing services in the original building. It is currently being modernized and an underground tram station is built underneath it. Hauptbahnhof is on the Munich–Augsburg and Ulm–Augsburg lines and is connected by ICE and IC services to Munich, Berlin, Dortmund, Frankfurt, Hamburg and Stuttgart. As of December 2007, the French TGV connected Augsburg with a direct High Speed Connection to Paris. In addition EC and night train services connect to Amsterdam, Paris and Vienna and connections will be substantially improved by the creation of the planned Magistrale for Europe.

The AVV operates seven Regionalbahn lines from the main station to:
Mammendorf
Schmiechen (direction to Ammersee)
Aichach/Radersdorf
Meitingen/Donauwörth
Dinkelscherben
Schwabmünchen
Klosterlechfeld
Starting in 2008, the regional services are planned to be altered to S-Bahn frequencies and developed long term as integrated into the Augsburg S-Bahn.

Air transport
Until 2005 Augsburg was served by nearby Augsburg Airport (AGB). In that year all air passenger transport was relocated to Munich Airport. Since then, the airport is used almost entirely by business airplanes.

Economy

Augsburg is a vibrant industrial city. Many global market leaders namely MAN, EADS or KUKA produce high technology products like printing systems, large diesel engines, industrial robots or components for the Airbus A380 and the Ariane carrier rocket. After Munich, Augsburg is considered the high-tech centre for Information and Communication in Bavaria and takes advantage of its lower operating costs, yet close proximity to Munich and potential customers. In 2018 the Bavarian State Government recognized this fact and promoted Augsburg to Metropole.

Major companies
Boewe Systec
Faurecia
Fujitsu Technology Solutions
KUKA Robotics / Systems
MAN (Maschinenfabrik Augsburg-Nürnberg)
manroland
MT-Aerospace (former MAN Technologie)
NCR
Osram
Premium AEROTEC
RENK AG (offshoot of MAN SE)
Siemens
UPM-Kymmene (former Haindl)
WashTec (former Kleindienst)
Synlab Group
Cancom
Check24
Amazon
Patrizia Immobilien

Education
Augsburg is home to the following universities and colleges:

University of Augsburg, founded in 1970
Hochschule Augsburg (University of Applied Sciences, formerly Fachhochschule Augsburg)

Media
The local newspaper is the Augsburger Allgemeine first published in 1807.

Notable people

Saint Afra, (died 304), patron Saint of Augsburg, martyr 
Simpert, (died 807), an abbot, bishop, and confessor
Saint Ulrich (c. 890–973), Prince-Bishopric of Augsburg.
Saint Wolfhard (1070–1127), a Swabian artisan, trader, and hermit 
Jakob Fugger the Elder (1398–1469), master weaver, town councillor and merchant.
Erhard Ratdolt (1442–1528), Printer, famous for having produced the first known printers type specimen book
Jakob Fugger (1459–1525), Noted banker and financial broker. An area within the city, called the Fuggerei was set aside for the poor and needy in 1519.
Hans Holbein the Elder (1460–1524), a pioneer in the transformation of German art from the Gothic to the Renaissance style.
Konrad Peutinger (1465–1547), humanist, jurist, diplomat, politician, economist and archaeologist.
Hans Burgkmair (1473–1531), painter and woodcut printmaker.
Caspar Aquila (1488–1560), a Lutheran theologian and reformer.
Hans Holbein the Younger (1497–1543), portrait and religious painter.
Matthäus Schwarz (1497–c. 1574), accountant and author
Paulus Hector Mair (1517–1579), martial artist
Wilhelm Xylander (1532–1576), a classical scholar and humanist.
Elias Holl (1573–1646), architect
Philipp Hainhofer (1578–1647), merchant, banker, diplomat and art collector
Julius Schiller (1580–1627), lawyer and astronomer
Johann Georg Wirsung (1589–1643), anatomist
Johann Jakob Brucker (1696–1770), a German historian of philosophy.
Andreas Christoph Graf (1701–1776), German teacher, author and poet
Johann Jakob Haid (1704–1767), engraver
Leopold Mozart (1719–1787), violinist-composer and father of Wolfgang Amadeus Mozart
Christoph Christian Sturm (1740–1786), preacher and author
Eduard Bayer (1822–1908), composer and classical guitarist
Emil Schürer (1844–1910), a Protestant theologian, studied the history of the Jews.
Johann Most (1846–1906), Social Democratic and then anarchist politician, newspaper editor and orator.
Rudolf Diesel (1858–1913), inventor of the diesel engine
Albert Rehm (1871–1949), philologist who first understood the significance of the Antikythera mechanism
Hans von Euler-Chelpin (1873–1964), co-recipient of 1929 Nobel Prize in Chemistry
Karl Haberstock (1878–1956), Art dealer to the Nazis
Artur Lauinger (1879–1961), German journalist
Julius Streicher (1885–1946), prominent Nazi prior to World War II, founder and publisher of anti-Semitic Der Stürmer newspaper, executed for war crimes
Julius Schaxel (1887–1943), biologist
Hans Loritz (1895–1946), Nazi SS concentration camp commandant
Bertolt Brecht (1898–1956), writer and theater director
August Schmidhuber (1901–1947), Nazi SS officer executed for war crimes
Wilhelm Gerstenmeier (1908–1944), SS concentration camp officer executed for war crimes
Josef Priller (1915–1961), Luftwaffe ace
Mietek Pemper (1920–2011), Polish-born Jew compiled and typed Oskar Schindler's list, which saved 1,200 Jewish prisoners from the Holocaust.
Günther Schneider-Siemssen (1926–2015), scenic designer
Hans Henning Atrott (born 1944), German author and theorist
Wolf Blitzer (born 1948), American journalist and CNN reporter
Günther K.H. Zupanc (born 1958), neurobiologist, researcher, university teacher, book author, journal editor, and educational reformer
Sheryl Lee (born 1967), actress, poet, and activist
Alexander Wesselsky (born 1968), lead singer of the German band Eisbrecher
Florian Hecker (born 1975), experimental electronic music composer
Marisa Olson (born 1977), artist
Benny Greb (born 1980), solo drum artist
Andreas Bourani (born 1983), singer-songwriter
Bianca Voitek (born 1985), female bodybuilder
Maximilian Hornung (born 1986), cellist

Sport 

Werner Haas (1927–1956), Grand Prix motorcycle road racer
Ulrich Biesinger (1933–2011), former German footballer, part of the team that won the 1954 FIFA World Cup
Helmut Haller (1939–2012), footballer who represented West Germany at three World Cups
Bernhard Langer (born 1957), professional golfer
Bernd Schuster (born 1959), football coach and former player
Armin Veh (born 1961), football coach
Philipp Kohlschreiber (born 1983), tennis player
Stefan Bradl (born 1989), motorcycle racer
Johnny Cecotto Jr. (born 1989), racing driver
Nico Sturm (born 1995), ice hockey player

Sports

FC Augsburg is a football team based in Augsburg and plays in the WWK ARENA to the south of the city centre. FC Augsburg secured promotion to Bundesliga in 2011 and have remained there ever since, qualifying for the Europa League for the first time in 2015 and securing mid-table finishes across the last few seasons. The club, nicknamed the Fuggerstädter or simply as FCA, reached the last 32 in the 2015-16 Europa League with a 1-0 aggregate defeat to Liverpool. The WWK ARENA, nicknamed the "Anfield of the B17 Highway" following the Liverpool UEL match, opened in July 2009 and also hosted games of the 2011 FIFA Women's World Cup. The 30,660 capacity arena is easily accessible from the city centre or the adjacent B17 dual carriageway.

The city is home to a DEL (first-division) ice hockey team, the Augsburger Panther. The original club, AEV, was formed in 1878, the oldest German ice sport club and regularly draws around 4000 spectators, quite reasonable for German ice hockey. Home games are played at the Curt Frenzel Stadion: a recently rebuilt (2012–2013) indoor rink and modern stadium and the club reached the 2018/19 DEL semi finals, eventually losing in the winner-takes-all game 7 to EHC Red Bull München (4-3 series defeat). Consequently, the Panthers qualified for the Champions Hockey League. Augsburg is also home to one of the most traditional German Baseball clubs, the Augsburg Gators and 2 American Football Clubs, the Raptors and Augsburg Storm, and in nearby Königsbrunn there's the Königsbrunn Ants.

For the 1972 Olympic Games in Munich, a Lech dam protective diversionary canal for river ice was converted into the world's first artificial whitewater slalom course: the Eiskanal and remains a world-class venue for whitewater competition and served as prototype for two dozen similar foreign courses.

Local city nicknames
While commonly called Fuggerstadt (Fuggers' city) due to the Fuggers residing there, within Swabia it is also often referred to as Datschiburg: which originated sometime in the 19th century refers to Augsburg's favorite sweet: the Datschi made from fruit, preferably prunes, and thin cake dough. The Datschiburger Kickers charity football team (founded in 1965) reflects this in its choice of team name.

Among younger people, the city is commonly called "Aux" for short.

See also

Augsburg University, a private Lutheran College in Minneapolis, Minnesota (USA) that takes its name from the Augsburg Confession
League of Augsburg
List of civic divisions of Augsburg
List of mayors of Augsburg
Synods of Augsburg

Notes

References
Die Chroniken der schwäbischen Städte, Augsburg, (Leipzig, 1865–1896).
Werner, Geschichte der Stadt Augsburg, (Augsburg, 1900).
Lewis, "The Roman Antiquities of Augsburg and Ratisbon", in volume xlviii, Archæological Journal, (London, 1891).
Michael Schulze, Augsburg in one day. A city tour Lehmstedt Verlag, Leipzig 2015, .

Bibliography

External links

Stadt Augsburg Official site (English version)
Augsburg Tourism Official tourism portal for Augsburg region
 Augsburg City Plan
 District of Augsburg
Hydraulic Engineering and Hydropower, Drinking Water and Decorative Fountains in Augsburg 

 
Roman towns and cities in Germany
15 BC establishments
Venues of the 1972 Summer Olympics
Displaced persons camps in the aftermath of World War II
1270s establishments in the Holy Roman Empire
1276 establishments in Europe
1803 disestablishments in the Holy Roman Empire
Free imperial cities
States and territories established in 1276
States and territories disestablished in 1803
World Heritage Sites in Germany